The El Dorado Junior College Building is a historic academic building at 300 South West Avenue in El Dorado, Arkansas.  The three story brick building was built in 1905 as a public school building for the county's white students.  From 1925 to 1937 the building house El Dorado Junior College, the first such institution in southwestern Arkansas; it has seen a variety of public and private academic uses since then.  The building is shaped roughly like a swastika, and has retained most of its external and internal Classical Revival style.

The building was listed on the National Register of Historic Places in 1978. It is now part of the South Arkansas Community College campus.

See also
W. F. & Estelle McWilliams House: Also on the SouthArk campus
South Arkansas Arboretum: operated by SouthArk
National Register of Historic Places listings in Union County, Arkansas

References

University and college buildings on the National Register of Historic Places in Arkansas
Neoclassical architecture in Arkansas
Art Deco architecture in Arkansas
School buildings completed in 1905
Buildings and structures in El Dorado, Arkansas
National Register of Historic Places in Union County, Arkansas
1905 establishments in Arkansas
Education in Union County, Arkansas
University and college buildings completed in 1905
School buildings on the National Register of Historic Places in Arkansas